The women's 5x5 basketball tournament at the 2018 Asian Games was held in Jakarta, Indonesia from 15 August to 1 September 2018.

Squads

Results
All times are Western Indonesia Time (UTC+07:00)

Preliminary

Group X

Group Y

Final round

Quarterfinals

Classification 5–8

Semifinals

Classification 7th–8th

Classification 5th–6th

Bronze medal game

Gold medal game

Final standing

References

External links
Basketball at the 2018 Asian Games

Women